Pasquale Saviotti (1792–1855) was an Italian painter and engraver who worked in a Neoclassical style.

He was born in Faenza, and initially studied design and engraving under Giuseppe Zauli in the Liceo Dipartimentale del Rubicone in Faenza. He later became an instructor at the school. In 1830, he moved to Florence where he developed a career as a painter. One of the pupils of both Zauli and Saviotti was Gaspare Mattioli.

References

1792 births
1855 deaths
19th-century Italian painters
Italian male painters
Italian neoclassical painters
People from Faenza
19th-century Italian male artists